Jack Creek Township is one of twelve townships in Emmet County, Iowa, USA.  As of the 2000 census, its population was 135.

History
Jack Creek Township was created in 1883.

Geography
According to the United States Census Bureau, Jack Creek Township covers an area of 35.71 square miles (92.48 square kilometers); of this, 35.67 square miles (92.39 square kilometers, 99.9 percent) is land and 0.03 square miles (0.09 square kilometers, 0.1 percent) is water.

Unincorporated towns
 Hoprig at 
(This list is based on USGS data and may include former settlements.)

Extinct towns
 Bubona at 
(These towns are listed as "historical" by the USGS.)

Adjacent townships
 Swan Lake Township (north)
 Armstrong Grove Township (northeast)
 Denmark Township (east)
 Independence Township, Palo Alto County (southeast)
 Vernon Township, Palo Alto County (south)
 Walnut Township, Palo Alto County (southwest)
 High Lake Township (west)
 Center Township (northwest)

School districts
 Armstrong-Ringsted Community School District
 Estherville Lincoln Central Community School District
 Graettinger Community School District

Political districts
 Iowa's 4th congressional district
 State House District 7
 State Senate District 4

References
 United States Census Bureau 2008 TIGER/Line Shapefiles
 United States Board on Geographic Names (GNIS)
 United States National Atlas

External links
 US-Counties.com
 City-Data.com

Townships in Emmet County, Iowa
Townships in Iowa